The men's 1500 metre freestyle competition at the 1999 Pan Pacific Swimming Championships took place on August 28–29 at the Sydney International Aquatic Centre.  The last champion was Grant Hackett of Australia.

Records
Prior to this competition, the existing world and Pan Pacific records were as follows:

Results
All times are in minutes and seconds.

Heats
The first round was held on August 28.

Final 
The final was held on August 29.

References

1999 Pan Pacific Swimming Championships